Kim Jong-Wook (born February 1, 1982) is a South Korean singer. He is best known for Only You, the theme song of the popular Korean reality show We Got Married. Before leaving for the army, Kim Jong-wook released a song "Goodbye for Now" (Army Entrance Day), which was released on December 4, 2009. He has a bachelor's degree in industrial engineering from Konkuk University and graduated from the Kyung Hee University Graduate School of Communication.

Discography

Albums 
 Kim Jong Wook First, August 2007
 For a Long Time, February 28, 2008
 One Fine Day (Mini-album), May 22, 2009
 Goodbye For Now, December 4, 2009

Singles 
 가난한 사랑 (Poor Love), 2007
 그대만이 (Only You), We Got Married OST, 2008
 그대에게 바래요 (Way Back into Love) with Solbi, 2008
 운명을 거슬러 (Going Against Fate) with SG Wannabe, East of Eden OST, 2009
 척하면 척 (If You Pretend) with Kang Min-kyung of Davichi, 2009

Awards

References

External links 
 Kim Jong-wook at KBS WORLD

1982 births
K-pop singers
Living people
MAMA Award winners
Konkuk University alumni
21st-century South Korean  male singers